Edmund Duke is the name of:

Edmund Duke (priest) (1563–1590), English priest and Catholic martyr
Edmund Duke (StarCraft), a fictional general in the StarCraft series